Bubang Techron (Hangul:부방테크론) is a major manufacturer of home appliances based in Seoul, South Korea.

History
The company was founded in 1976. Until 2004, the company was an OEM manufacturer for LG, in which some LG branded Pressure Rice Cookers suddenly exploded (because of clogging of the pressure vents) upon failure of the interlocking system which forced LG to recall the suspected units and eventually pull out of that specific market.

Currently the 8th ranked manufacturer of pressure rice cookers in South Korea (Cuckoo Co., Ltd. is ranked first).

Operating Brands
LivartLiving Tech

Products
Rice Cookers
Pressurized
Conventional
Ultra-violet dish dryers
Heaters
Irons
Hot water pots
Pressurized
Conventional

Major Competitors
South Korea:
Samsung under brand Novita
Cuckoo Co., Ltd. under brand name Cuckoo

Japan:
Matsushita (National, Panasonic)
Zojirushi
Hitachi (Hitachi Hometec)
Sanyo Electric
Tiger

Markets
Currently in South Korea, it began exporting to the United States as of late 2003.

Company Site
Bubang Techron Co., Ltd.

Home appliance manufacturers of South Korea
Companies based in Seoul
Manufacturing companies established in 1976
South Korean companies established in 1976
South Korean brands